An official history is a work of history which is sponsored, authorised or endorsed by its subject. The term is most commonly used for histories which are produced for a government. The term also applies to commissions from non-state bodies including histories of commercial companies. An official biography (one written with the permission, cooperation and sometimes the participation of its subject or heirs) is an authorised biography.

Official histories frequently have the advantage that the author has had access to archives, been allowed to interview subjects and use other primary sources closed to independent historians. Because of the close relationship between author and subject, such works may be (or be perceived to be) partisan in tone and to lack historical objectivity. Such bias varies and some official histories have been called exercises in propaganda; in other cases the authors have retained a measure of independence.

Early official histories

Each book in the Twenty-Four Histories records the official history of a Chinese dynasty. Sixteen of the histories were written between the 7th and 15th centuries. The first is Records of the Grand Historian, authored by Sima Qian (– BCE) in the Han dynasty and the last is History of Ming (completed in the 1730s). From the Tang dynasty (618–907) a government office for historiography compiled official histories. They were revised and expanded by the compilers during the dynasty and the succeeding dynasty published a final edition.

Modern official histories

The modern form of official history began in the mid-nineteenth century in reports written as military guides for later officers. The histories were detailed descriptions of events, not easy reading for a lay audience and left judgements to the discretion of a mainly professional readership. After the First World War, the New Zealand government decided that after a total war, its official histories should be written for a public who had fought in the war or supported the war effort. After the Second World War, the low academic standard of military education, especially in historical analysis, led to a view that professionally trained historians should write official histories, applying their academic training to explain why as well as describe what. Since many of the academics had participated in the war, they could be expected to have experience of military service and knowledge of the war to inform their writing. A contemporary view is that official history should incorporate the three points of view, containing the detailed description needed for works of military instruction but also to be suitable for a general readership and to show how participants tried to solve problems, drawing lessons from their successes and failures. None of the points of view to be served by the production of official history is immune to error, because work by a military historian might be fraudulent for personal or political reasons, distorting the record. Populist history can dilute the story to the point of worthlessness and civilian academics can be prone to select facts and interpretations according to ideals, ideology and preconceived ideas.

Military histories written as textbooks might be thought to have a basis in truth, necessary to teach useful lessons to students. The British Report of the Committee on the Lessons of the Great War (Kirk Report, 1931) drew on the published volumes of the British official history and the conclusions were incorporated into a new edition of Field Service Regulations. That operations might be conducted in Iraq and Iran, led to official history volumes being produced against the objections of the Foreign Office. Military histories concentrated on the doings of national contingents, with only rare references to those of allied and opposing armies, since they had their own histories. Comparative analysis can be absent and national bias from ulterior motives, like mythologising and apologetics can also be found. The Australian Official History of Australia in the War of 1914–1918 edited by Charles Bean contains exaggerations of the significance of the Australian contribution, the prowess of Australian soldiers and disparagement of soldiers from Britain and its allies. Australian failures and casualties are sometimes blamed on British higher commanders, when high-ranking Australian officers could justly be criticised. The post-war Royal Air Force (RAF) was at risk of abolition and to justify its existence needed a function that could not be replicated by the army or navy. The parts of The War in the Air (six text volumes and an appendix volume, 1922–1937) written by Walter Raleigh and Henry Jones, gave undue emphasis to strategic bombing, which unbalanced the work.

Many of the historians, editors and contributors to the History of the Great War (1915–1949) had been senior officers during the war, which had the advantage first-hand knowledge of events and experience of military art for the work but this risked allowing a desire to protect reputations to intrude, leading to unfair blame, particularly on outsiders. Volume III of  the Royal Navy history Naval Operations (1923) had the narrative of the Battle of Jutland (1916) and the draft text was revised at the request of some serving officers present at the battle, to remove critical remarks about them. When a revised edition was published in 1940, many of the officers were retired or dead but the excised passages were not restored. The British Army Military Operations.... volumes have been criticised for dishonesty in not blaming General Headquarters (GHQ) for the extent of British casualties and for exculpating Sir Douglas Haig (commander of the British Expeditionary Force (BEF) from December 1915 to the Armistice). That the history is a description of events, rather than an analytical work with criticism and conclusions, means that Haig and other commanders may escape blame, yet it leaves the reader free to form conclusions.

Military official histories

Austria-Hungary
 Österreich-Ungarns Letzter Krieg, 1914–1918 (Austria-Hungary's Last War, 1914–1918)

Australia
 Official History of Australia in the War of 1914–1918
 Australia in the War of 1939–1945
 Australia in the Korean War 1950–53
 The Official History of Australia's Involvement in Southeast Asian Conflicts 1948–1975
 Official History of Australian Peacekeeping, Humanitarian and Post-Cold War Operations
 Official History of Australian Operations in Iraq and Afghanistan, and Australian Peacekeeping Operations in East Timor

Belgium
 La Belgique et la Guerre (Belgium and the War)

Britain
 British Official History of the Nile Expedition
 Official History of the War in South Africa 1899–1902
 History of the Great War
 History of the Second World War
 The Official History of the Falklands Campaign

Canada
 Official History of the Canadian Army in the First World War
 Official History of the Canadian Army in the Second World War
 Official History of the Canadian Army in the Korean War

France
 Les armées françaises dans la Grande guerre (The French armies in the Great War)

Germany
 Der Weltkrieg 1914 bis 1918: Militärischen Operationen zu Lande (The World War 1914–1918: Military Operations on Land)
 Der Krieg zur See 1914–1918 (The War at Sea 1914–1918)
 Die Bayern im Großen Kriege 1914–1918 (Bavaria in the Great War 1914–1918)
 Das Deutsche Reich und der Zweite Weltkrieg (Germany and the Second World War)

Italy
 Maggiore Esercito: Ufficio Storico  L'esercito Italiano nella Grande Guerra 1915–1918 (General Army Historical Office: The Italian Army in the Great War 1915–1918)
Ufficio Storico della Regia Marina La Marina Italiano nella Grande Guerra (Royal Navy Historical Office: The Italian Navy in the Great War 1915–1918)

India
 Official History of the Indian Armed Forces In the Second World War (1939–1945)
 Official History of the 1971 India Pakistan War

Netherlands
 The Kingdom of the Netherlands During World War II

New Zealand
 Official History of New Zealand's Effort in the Great War
 Official History of New Zealand in the Second World War 1939–45

United States
 The Official Record of the United States' Part in the Great War
 The Army Air Forces in World War II
 History of United States Naval Operations in World War II
 United States Army in World War II

South Africa
 The Union of South Africa and the Great War 1914–1918: Official History
 South African Forces, World War II

Footnotes

References

Further reading

External links
 Australian Official Histories, 1914–1918
 Australian Official Histories, 1939–1945
 Canadian Official Histories, 1914–1918, 1939–1945 
 Les Armées françaises dans la Grande Guerre (French)
 Der Weltkrieg 1914 bis 1918: Militärischen Operationen zu Lande (German)
 Der Krieg zur See (German)
 Indian Official History of the Indo-Pakistan War, 1971
 L'esercito Italiano nella Grande Guerra 1915–1918 (Italian)
 New Zealand in the First World War 1914–1918
 New Zealand in the Second World War
 Österreich-Ungarns Letzter Krieg, 1914–1918 (German)
 Austria-Hungary's last War 1914–1918 (English)
 The US Army in World War II

Historiography
Series of non-fiction books